Datuk Gabuh bin Piging P.G.D.K. (11 January 1932 - 31 August 2010) represented North Borneo in the triple jump at the 1956 Summer Olympics, he finished 24th. He later competed at the 1962 British Empire and Commonwealth Games in the long jump and triple jump where he finished 10th in the latter.

References

External links
 

Athletes (track and field) at the 1956 Summer Olympics
1932 births
People from Sabah
2010 deaths
Kadazan-Dusun people
Malaysian male triple jumpers
Athletes (track and field) at the 1958 British Empire and Commonwealth Games
Athletes (track and field) at the 1962 British Empire and Commonwealth Games
Olympic athletes of North Borneo
Commonwealth Games competitors for North Borneo
Malaysian male long jumpers